The Tucker Carriage House is a historic carriage house located at Raleigh, North Carolina.  It is a large, three-story outbuilding that is the only remaining structure from the estate of Rufus Sylvester Tucker, a Confederate army officer and prominent merchant in post-Civil War Raleigh.  It is believed to have been built around 1883, when Tucker purchased materials for a "wagon shed", but does not appear on maps of the area until 1909.

The building is sheathed in clapboard on the first floor, and shakes on the second. The roof is covered with slate shingles and is capped by a square cupola that served to ventilate the interior.

References

Commercial buildings on the National Register of Historic Places in North Carolina
Buildings and structures completed in 1883
Queen Anne architecture in North Carolina
Buildings and structures in Raleigh, North Carolina
National Register of Historic Places in Raleigh, North Carolina